Mesolita is a genus of longhorn beetles of the subfamily Lamiinae, containing the following species:

 Mesolita alternata Carter, 1929
 Mesolita antennalis Carter, 1929
 Mesolita ephippiata Lea, 1918
 Mesolita inermis van der Poll, 1892
 Mesolita interrupta Lea, 1918
 Mesolita lineolata Pascoe, 1862  
 Mesolita myrmecophila Lea, 1918
 Mesolita pascoei van der Poll, 1892
 Mesolita scutellata Lea, 1918
 Mesolita simplicicollis Aurivillius, 1920
 Mesolita transversa Pascoe, 1862

References

Parmenini